James Harry Smith (May 15, 1890 – April 1, 1922) played 75 games of  Major League Baseball between 1914 and 1918, mostly as a catcher.  In all he had 148 at bats, his 27 hits produced one homer and 14 RBI for an average of .182, not sufficient to prolong his career in the big leagues.  He started with the New York Giants, moving to the Brooklyn Tip-Tops for 1915, but he returned mid-way through the season.  He was absent from the big leagues for 1916, starting 1917 with Cincinnati Reds, but after a couple of seasons as a peripheral figure with an average below .200, he disappeared from the big leagues for good.

External links
 Harry Smith's stats at MLB.com
 Harry Smith references at BaseballLibrary.com

Major League Baseball catchers
New York Giants (NL) players
Brooklyn Tip-Tops players
Cincinnati Reds players
1890 births
1922 deaths
Place of birth missing
Worcester Busters players
Fort Wayne Chiefs players
Akron Buckeyes players
Newark Bears (IL) players
Reading Aces players
Baseball players from Baltimore